Susie Snowflake is a lost American silent film released by Paramount Pictures on June 25, 1916. The picture was directed by James Kirkwood, Sr. and filmed by cinematographer Ned Van Buren. Susie Snowflake was written and adapted for the screen by Shannon Fife and introduced to American filmgoers, actress Ann Pennington.

Reception
The Moving Picture World, 1916

Susie Snowflake at the Broadway.

Ann Pennington, the celebrated little Ziegfeld Follies star, made her motion picture debut in the Famous Players production, Susie Snowflake, at the Broadway theater. There is something irresistibly appealing about "Susie," and Miss Pennington has caught the charm of the little dancer who scandalizes her maiden aunts and sets a whole town agog when she brings her Broadway ideals into the community. But there is a lot of real character and unswerving loyality in "Susie," as she proves when she is put to the test.

The usual weekly news, colored scenics, educational studies, short comedies and cartoons round out the bill.
 
Ladies Home Companion, 1916
Susie Snowflake, Famous Players Paramount, 5 reels: When Ann Pennington, as little Susie the dancer, brought up on the stage, arrives in a small town to live with her spinster aunts, something is bound to happen. It does happen in an amusing way.

Forest Leaves, 1916
Monday and Tuesday the diminutive  star of musical comedy, Ann Pennington, makes her debut before the camera in the Paramount masterpiece “Susie Snowflake." When Miss Pennington appeared in “The Red Widow” the success was instantaneous and her popularity has gained constantly since. The story of “Susie Snowflake" alternates between Broadway, New York, with its hilarity and gay night life, and the quiet and peaceful surroundings of the “little old home town." The piece is full of excitement, dramatic passages, romance and humor.

Photoplay Magazine, 1916
Ann Pennington, in "Susie Snowflake." Here is a bright little star so far without an appropriate picture play. "Susie" was dreadful.

Cast
Ann Pennington…  Susie
Leo Delaney …  David
William Courtleigh, Jr. …   Roy
William J. Butler	...  Amos
Marcia Harris ... 	Martha
Billie Wilson	... 	Phoebe
Source IMDb.com

References

External links
 
 lobby poster(archived)

1916 films
American silent feature films
Films directed by James Kirkwood Sr.
Paramount Pictures films
Lost American films
American black-and-white films
1910s American films